Butenko is a surname. Notable people with the surname include:

Aleksandr Butenko (born 1998), Russian footballer
Anatoliy Butenko (1938–2021), Ukrainian politician
Bohdan Butenko (1933–2019), Polish cartoonist
Boris Butenko (1923–1999), Soviet athlete
Eduard Butenko (1941–2006), Russian actor and theatre director
Roman Butenko (1980–2012), Ukrainian footballer
Sergei Butenko (born 1960), Russian football coach and former player
Valeri Butenko (1941–2020), Soviet footballer

See also
 

Ukrainian-language surnames